Camera Café is a Philippine television situational comedy series broadcast by GMA Network and QTV. Directed by Mark Meily, it premiered in April 2007. The series concluded in 2009.

Cast and characters

Epi Quizon as JC
Bearwin Meily as Harvey
Candy Pangilinan as Fonda
Assunta De Rossi as Puri
Jaime Fabregas as Boss Ric
Christian Vasquez as Sylvio
Kalila Aguilos as Carol
Vincent De Jesus as Pipay
Arnold Reyes as Vince
Noel Colet as Serge
Joy Viado as Joy
LJ Reyes as Julie
Gerhard Acao as Charm
Wilma Doesnt as New Manang
Patricia Ismael as Amanda
Monica Llamas as Gina

Former cast
 Jojo Alejar as JC
 Angel Aquino as Manang

Accolades

References

External links
 

2007 Philippine television series debuts
2009 Philippine television series endings
Filipino-language television shows
GMA Network original programming
Philippine comedy television series
Philippine television sitcoms
Workplace comedy television series